Fitzroy F. A. Bedeau (born August 29, 1944) is a politician and former police officer from the island of Grenada.  From 1998 until 2005 he served as the commissioner of the Royal Grenada Police Force. In 2004, he dealt with the chaos that resulted from Hurricane Ivan hitting Grenada, which eventually resulted in at least 12 deaths.

In 2008, he stood for the Parliament of Grenada on the New National Party ticket. In July 2008, he was charged with assault after an altercation with a female student who criticized his behavior.

References

1944 births
Living people
Grenadian police officers
New National Party (Grenada) politicians